The October 1995 massacres were carried out by the LTTE, an organization which has been banned in 33 countries including the US, Australia, EU, India and Canada due to its terrorist activities.

These massacres occurred at small villages in the Eastern province of Sri Lanka. These massacres formed part of a series of massacres aimed at driving Sinhalese civilians from the Eastern province of Sri Lanka in the process of ethnic cleansing.

Incident 
During these massacres, 120 Sinhalese civilians were killed by LTTE. Many of the victims were hacked to death with swords and axes.

See also 
 List of massacres in Sri Lanka
 List of attacks attributed to the LTTE
 List of attacks attributed to Sri Lankan government forces

Notes

References and further reading 
 Gunaratna, Rohan. (1998). Sri Lanka's Ethnic Crisis and National Security, Colombo: South Asian Network on Conflict Research. 
 Gunaratna, Rohan. (October 1, 1987). War and Peace in Sri Lanka: With a Post-Accord Report From Jaffna, Sri Lanka: Institute of Fundamental Studies. 
 Gunasekara, S.L. (November 4, 2003). The Wages of Sin, 
 https://web.archive.org/web/20050320003919/http://dosfan.lib.uic.edu/ERC/democracy/1995_hrp_report/95hrp_report_sasia/SriLanka.html

Massacres in 1995
October 1995 events in Asia
October 1995 crimes
Massacres in Sri Lanka
Mass murder of Sinhalese
Mass murder in 1995
Terrorist incidents in Sri Lanka in 1995